Lipton is a British brand of tea, owned by Ekaterra. Lipton was also a supermarket chain in the United Kingdom, later sold to Argyll Foods, after which the company sold only tea. The company is named after its founder, Sir Thomas Lipton, who founded it in 1890. The Lipton ready-to-drink beverages are sold by "Pepsi Lipton International", a company jointly owned by Ekaterra and PepsiCo. They also make soup, but this is not as widespread.

History

Origins

In 1871, Thomas Lipton (1848–1931) of Glasgow, Scotland, used his small savings to open his own shop, and by the 1880s the business had grown to more than 200 shops. In 1929, the Lipton grocery retail business was one of the companies that merged with Home and Colonial Stores, Maypole Dairy Company, Vyes & Boroughs, Templetons, Galbraiths & Pearks to form a food group with more than 3,000 shops. The group traded in the high street under various names, but was registered on the UK stock market as Allied Suppliers.  Lipton's became a supermarket chain focused on small towns. Allied was acquired by Argyll Foods in 1982; the supermarket business was rebranded as Presto during the 1980s.

Development

Shortly after opening his shop Thomas Lipton began travelling the world for new items to stock. One such item was tea, a rare and expensive luxury at the time. Sales had doubled from £40 million in the late 1870s to £80 million by the mid-1880s. In 1890 Lipton purchased tea gardens in Ceylon, now Sri Lanka, from where he packaged and sold the first Lipton tea. He arranged packaging and shipping at low cost, and sold his tea in packets by the pound (454g), half-pound (227g), and quarter-pound (113g), with the advertising slogan: "Direct from the tea gardens to the teapot." Lipton teas were an immediate success in the United States.

The Lipton tea business was acquired by consumer goods company Unilever in a number of separate transactions, starting with the purchase of the United States and Canadian Lipton business in 1938 and completed in 1972 when Unilever bought the remainder of the global Lipton business from Allied Suppliers.

In 1991, Unilever created a first joint venture with PepsiCo, the Pepsi Lipton Partnership, for the marketing of ready to drink (bottled and canned) teas in North America. This was followed in 2003 by a second joint venture, Pepsi-Lipton International (PLI), covering many non-United States markets. PLI was expanded in September 2007 to include a number of large European markets. PepsiCo and Unilever each control 50 percent of the shares of these joint ventures.

Due to the 2008 Chinese milk scandal, food giant Unilever started recalling its Lipton milk tea powder in Hong Kong and Macau on 30 September 2008. The tea powder, which used Chinese milk powder as its raw ingredient, was recalled after the company's internal checks found traces of melamine in the powder.

In 2011, PETA criticized Unilever for conducting and funding experiments on rabbits, pigs and other animals in an attempt to make human health claims about the tea’s ingredients. According to the animal rights organization, Unilever decided to end the practice of Lipton products after receiving more than 40,000 appeals from PETA supporters and days before PETA made plans to launch its "Lipton CruelTEA" campaign. Unilever no longer tests their products on animals unless required to by governments as part of their regulatory requirements.

Soup mixes
Lipton produces instant soup mixes. In the 1950s in the United States, Lipton ran an advertisement campaign promoting French onion dip prepared at home using Lipton's French onion soup mix, thus helping to popularize chips and dip. Hundreds of new commercially produced varieties of dips were later introduced in the U.S.

Present day

Lipton teas are a blend selected from many different plantations around the world, from well-known producing countries including Sri Lanka, India, Kenya, and China. Lipton Yellow Label is blended from about 20 different teas.

Apart from the usual black leaves tea (with the long-standing Lipton Yellow Label brand), the company markets many other varieties, both as leaf and ready-to-drink beverages. These include green teas, flavoured black teas, herbal teas, Lipton Linea (a "slimming tea") in Europe, and Lipton Milk Tea in various Asian markets. Lipton's owner Ekaterra sells PG-Tips tea in the UK, and does not retail any Lipton-branded products except Lipton Ice Tea which is still part of Unilever.

In a number of markets, including Japan, Russia and Australia, the company is advertising the benefits of theanine, which has psychoactive properties.

Lipton still owns plantations in East Africa (Kericho, Kenya and Mufindi, Tanzania). In May 2007, Unilever became the first company to commit to sourcing all its tea in a sustainable manner. Working with the Rainforest Alliance, an international environmental NGO, Lipton and its parent company, Unilever, announced all Lipton Yellow Label tea bags sold in Western Europe would be certified by 2010 and all Lipton tea bags sold globally by 2015.  Lipton's own tea estates were among the first to be certified.  Product bearing the Rainforest Alliance seal appeared on Western European markets in 2008 and started appearing in North America in 2009.

On 6 May 2009, Lipton received a Corporate Green Globe Award for its work with the Rainforest Alliance.

Brands

Lipton's main pillar brands are Lipton Yellow Label and Lipton Iced Tea. Other product lines include the Lipton pyramid (tetrahedron) range in Europe and North America, and Lipton Milk Tea in East Asia. In 2008, the brand launched Lipton Linea in Western Europe.

Lipton Yellow Label
Lipton Yellow Label has been sold since 1890, when Thomas Lipton introduced the first version of the Yellow pack with a red Lipton shield, still in use. It is sold in 150 countries worldwide. Lipton Yellow Label is a blend of several types of tea, sold both in tea bags and as open tea, rolled into small leaves like gunpowder green tea.

Lipton Iced Tea
Lipton Iced Tea or Lipton Ice Tea is sold in five flavours, lemon, peach, peach & nectarine, mango and raspberry. Green Tea and Rooibos flavours are also available in some regions.

Lipton Brisk
Brisk, formerly Lipton Brisk, is an iced tea brand distributed primarily in North America as a joint venture between Lipton and PepsiCo. It differs from Lipton's other iced tea brands in that phosphoric acid is added to the blend, giving the beverage a distinctive sharp flavour.

Lipton Pyramid Tea
Lipton also produces tea using the tetrahedral bag format as seen in other tea brands. Lipton Clear was launched in five variants, Earl Grey Tea, English Breakfast Tea, Peach Mango Tea, Green Tea Mandarin Orange, Mint and Camomile Tea.

Pure Leaf
Pure Leaf is an iced tea brand distributed primarily in The Americas by the PepsiCo-Lipton joint venture. Unlike Lipton Iced Tea and Brisk, which use a freeze-dried instant tea powder, Pure Leaf is brewed in liquid. The brand is sold in square bottles made of recyclable PET plastic.

Lipton worldwide
Available in over 110 countries, Lipton is particularly popular in Europe, North America, Africa and the Middle East, parts of Asia and Australasia (Australia and New Zealand) as well as Latin America, and the Caribbean. Despite its British origins, Lipton black tea (such as Yellow Label) is not marketed in the UK, as owner Ekaterra sells PG Tips tea there. Lipton Ice Tea and fruit teas are available in the UK. Due to the Russian invasion of Ukraine, Ekaterra decided in August of the same year to completely withdraw from the Russian market and stop the production and sale of Lipton tea.

Marketing and advertising

In 1914, Lipton's tea were one of the sponsors for the first flight from Melbourne to Sydney by French aviator Maurice Guillaux, at the time the longest air mail and air freight flight in the world. Sponsor Lipton printed 250,000 copies of a letter Guillaux wrote saying "I found it the most delicious tea I have ever tasted....I found it very soothing to the nerves", and these could be had by sending Lipton a one-penny stamp. For a threepenny stamp, Lipton would send out a quarter-pound pack of tea.

In an attempt to change the negative perception of Lipton Ice Tea in the United Kingdom – as 60% claimed they did not like the taste before even trying it – Lipton carried out a London-based summer marketing campaign in 2010 under the slogan "Don't knock it 'til you’ve tried it!"; roaming demonstrators handed out 498,968 samples over the 58-day run.  After the campaign, 87% of consumers claimed to enjoy Lipton Ice Tea, while 73% said they were more likely to purchase in the future. A similar campaign, with slogan "Let's Go!", was carried out in summer 2017. Lipton also made commercials starring The Muppets for the 2014 Disney film Muppets Most Wanted.

Product quality controversy
In November 2011, the General Administration of Quality Supervision, Inspection and Quarantine of China found high levels of pesticides such as bifenthrin in one variety of Lipton tea. Unilever responded by clearing the shelves of all affected products. In April 2012, Greenpeace raised further questions about Lipton products in China, after two varieties of Lipton tea the group purchased in Beijing supermarkets failed safety tests, with the results allegedly failing to meet the regulations enforced in the European Union. The group also stated, "Some of the detected pesticides are also banned for use in tea production by the Chinese Ministry of Agriculture." Unilever China denied the findings, stating all Lipton products within the country were safe.

Lipton's Seat 

Lipton's Seat is a high observation point in the hills of Poonagala, Bandarawela, Sri Lanka, near Thomas Lipton's first tea plantation, the Dambatenne Tea Factory. It is reached by climbing for around 8 km, surrounded by peaceful green tea plantations and an occasional colourful tea plucker. From Lipton's Seat the Uva, Sabaragamuywa and Central province spread out from before one's feet in a display rivalling that of another famed Sri Lankan observation point, World's End, Sri Lanka within the Horton Plains National Park in the Nuwara Eliya District.

See also
 Lipton Institute of Tea
 Cup-a-Soup
 Brooke Bond
 Tata Tea
 Tetley
 Tetley Tea Folk
 Typhoo tea
 Twinings
 Yorkshire Tea

References

External links

 

1871 establishments in Scotland
Retail companies established in 1871
Retail companies disestablished in 1929
1929 disestablishments in Scotland
Companies based in Glasgow
History of Glasgow
Defunct companies of Scotland
Retail companies of Scotland
Defunct retail companies of the United Kingdom
Food manufacturers of Scotland
Defunct supermarkets of the United Kingdom
Products introduced in 1890
Scottish brands
Iced tea brands
Tea companies of the United Kingdom
Ekaterra
PepsiCo brands
Former Unilever brands
Tea brands in the United Kingdom
Food and drink companies established in 1890
Food and drink companies disestablished in 1972
1972 mergers and acquisitions
British companies established in 1871
British companies disestablished in 1972
British companies disestablished in 1929